Christopher Robert Porter (born September 27, 1970) is a Canadian political activist and was the biggest buyer and seller of dolphins in the world.

He was the leader of the small Canadian Action Party between 2010 and 2012  and was a candidate in the federal by-election in Toronto—Danforth. He lost the election to New Democratic Party candidate Craig Scott. Porter received 75 votes.

From 2003 to 2009 he sold 83 dolphins around the world. In late 2009, he stated that he was leaving the dolphin-export business to become an environmental activist. In March 2010, Porter said that he had decided to release his last 17 dolphins back into the wild however the majority were not released, and died in captivity.

Past work
During the 1990s, Porter worked at Sealand of the Pacific, where he trained Tilikum the killer whale. Later, he worked at the Vancouver Aquarium where he was the head trainer. He was a consultant for Italy's national aquarium, Aquarium of Genoa, prior to his work in the Solomon Islands. During 2005 he created the world's first open ocean dive program with sea lions in Curaçao, Netherlands Antilles.

Dolphin resort and export business
In 2003 Porter established a resort business to be funded by dolphin exports in the Solomon Islands where he leased Gavutu Island, a World War II Japanese seaplane base. In 2005, Dave Phillips, executive director of the Earth Island Institute described Porter's captures of dolphins as 'horrific' and the 'worst instance of capture for dolphin trafficking in the world'.  Campaigners in 2005 sought to free dolphins held at the resort run by Porter, describing them as "depressed".  Porter's associate replied that the claims were lies and government health inspections had assessed the animals as being free from disease and infection.

Free the Pod
In 2010, Porter started the 'Free the Pod' campaign, aiming to release captive dolphins back into the wild. He has said he was "disillusioned with the industry", due to the death of trainer Dawn Brancheau in an incident with Tillikum and the documentary The Cove. Dave Phillips and Earth Island Institute accepted Porter's invitation to join with him for Free the Pod, which was featured in Animal Planet's Blood Dolphin$ series.

References

1970 births
Canadian Action Party politicians
Canadian environmentalists
Leaders of political parties in Canada
Living people
Politicians from Victoria, British Columbia